Huangjian may refer to:

Huangjian, Jiangsu (黄尖), a town in Yancheng, Jiangsu, China.
Huang Jian, a watercourse in Gansu, China

Historical eras
Huangjian (皇建, 560–561), era name used by Emperor Xiaozhao of Northern Qi
Huangjian (皇建, 1210–1211), era name used by Emperor Xiangzong of Western Xia